Ingeborg Bachmann (25 June 1926 – 17 October 1973) was an Austrian poet and author.

Biography
Bachmann was born in Klagenfurt, in the Austrian state of Carinthia, the daughter of Olga (née Haas) and Matthias Bachmann, a schoolteacher. Her father was an early member of the Austrian National Socialist Party. She had a sister, Isolde, and a brother, Heinz.

She studied philosophy, psychology, German philology, and law at the universities of Innsbruck, Graz, and Vienna.  In 1949, she received her doctor of philosophy from the University of Vienna with her dissertation titled "The Critical Reception of the Existential Philosophy of Martin Heidegger"; her thesis adviser was Victor Kraft.

After graduating, Bachmann worked as a scriptwriter and editor at the Allied radio station Rot-Weiss-Rot, a job that enabled her to obtain an overview of contemporary literature and also supplied her with a decent income, making possible proper literary work.  Furthermore, her first radio dramas were published by the station.  Her literary career was enhanced by contact with Hans Weigel (littérateur and sponsor of young post-war literature) and the literary circle known as Gruppe 47, whose members also included Ilse Aichinger, Paul Celan, Heinrich Böll, Marcel Reich-Ranicki and Günter Grass. She won the Prize of Group 47 in 1953 for her poetry collection Die gestundete Zeit.

In 1953, she moved to Rome, Italy, where she spent the large part of the following years working on poems, essays and short stories as well as opera libretti in collaboration with Hans Werner Henze, which soon brought with them international fame and numerous awards. From 1958 to 1963, she lived on and off with Max Frisch. Her 1971 novel, Malina, has been described as a response, at least partially, to his 1964 novel Mein Name sei Gantenbein.

During her later years she suffered from alcoholism and from an addiction to medication prescribed by her doctor. A friend described it:"I was deeply shocked by the magnitude of her tablet addiction. It must have been 100 per day, the bin was full of empty boxes. She looked bad, she was waxlike and pale. And her whole body was covered in bruises. I wondered what could have caused them. Then, when I saw how she slipped her Gauloise that she smoked and let it burn off on her arm, I realized: burns caused by falling cigarettes. The numerous tablets had made her body insensible to pain." 
On the night of 25 September 1973, her nightgown caught on fire and she was taken to the Sant'Eugenio Hospital at 7:05 A.M. the following morning for treatment of second and third degree burns. Local police concluded that the fire was caused by a cigarette. During her stay, she experienced withdrawal symptoms from barbiturate substance abuse, though the doctors treating her were not aware of the cause. This may have contributed to her subsequent death on 17 October 1973. She is buried at the Annabichl cemetery in Klagenfurt.

Writings 
Bachmann's doctoral dissertation expresses her growing disillusionment with Heideggerian existentialism, which was in part resolved through her growing interest in Ludwig Wittgenstein, whose Tractatus Logico-Philosophicus significantly influenced her relationship to language. During her lifetime, Bachmann was known mostly for her two collections of poetry, Die gestundete Zeit and Anrufung des Grossen Bären.

Bachmann's literary work focuses on themes like personal boundaries, establishment of the truth, and philosophy of language, the latter in the tradition of Wittgenstein. Many of her prose works represent the struggles of women to survive and to find a voice in post-war society. She also addresses the histories of imperialism and fascism, in particular, the persistence of imperialist ideas in the present. Fascism was a recurring theme in her writings. In her novel Der Fall Franza (The Case of Franza) Bachmann argued that fascism had not died in 1945 but had survived in the German speaking world of the 1960s in human relations and particularly in men's oppression of women. In Germany the achievements of the women's rights campaign at the end of the 19th and beginning of the 20th century had been systematically undone by the fascist Nazi regime in the 1930s. Bachmann's engagement with fascism followed that of other women writers who in the immediate post-war period dealt with fascism from a woman's perspective, such as Anna Seghers, Ilse Aichinger, Ingeborg Drewitz and Christa Wolf.

Bachmann was also in the vanguard of Austrian women writers who discovered in their private lives the political realities from which they attempted to achieve emancipation. Bachmann's writings and those of Barbara Frischmuth, Brigitte Schwaiger and Anna Mitgutsch were widely published in Germany. Male Austrian authors such as Franz Innerhofer, Josef Winkler and Peter Turrini wrote equally popular works on traumatic experiences of socialisation. Often these authors produced their works for major German publishing houses. After Bachmann's death in 1973 Austrian writers such as Thomas Bernhard, Peter Handke and Elfriede Jelinek continued the tradition of Austrian literature in Germany.

Lectures 
Between November 1959 and February 1960 Bachmann gave five lectures on poetics at the Goethe University Frankfurt. Known as the Frankfurter Vorlesungen: Probleme zeitgenössischer Dichtung (Frankfurt Lectures: Problems of Contemporary Writings) they are historically and substantively Bachmann's central work. In it she explained recurring themes in her early literary publications and she discussed the function of literature in society. Bachmann insisted that literature had to be viewed in its historic context, thus foreshadowing a rising interest in studying the connection between literary discourse and the contemporary understanding of history.

In the first lecture on Fragen und Scheinfragen (Questions and Pseudo Questions) Bachmann focused on the role of writers in the post-war society and lists essential questions that are "destructive and frightening in their simplicity". They are: why write? What do we mean by change and why do we want it through art? What are the limitations of the writer who wants to bring about change? Bachmann asserted that the great literary accomplishments of the 20th century were expressions in language and thus the poetic moral and intellectual renewal. In her mind the writer's new thinking and experience formed the core of the literary works. This in turn lets a writer come closer to a new language. She stressed that a new language was inhabited by a new spirit. Thus a writer may despair over the importance of language and she cited Hugo von Hofmannsthal's Ein Brief (1902) as the first articulation of this problem.

The second lecture Über Gedichte (On Poems) distinguishes poetry with its new power to grasp reality in its language, from other genres such as novels and plays. With reference to Günter Eich and Stefan George she identified a new generation of poet-prophets whose mission it was to lead the world to the discovery of an "ever purer heaven of art". She set these poets apart from the surrealists who aspired to violence and the futurists who claimed that "war is beautiful". She argued that these two movements exemplified art-for-art's sake and that the careers of Gottfried Benn and Ezra Pound exemplified the friendship between pure aestheticism with political barbarism. She referenced Kafka on the need to "take the axe to the frozen sea in us" and the refusal to remain silent about the crimes in our world. In the lecture she also named writings of Nelly Sachs, Marie Luise Kaschnitz, Hans Magnus Enzensberger and Paul Celan as examples of new poetry.

In the third lecture on Das schreibende Ich (The Writing "I") Bachmann addressed the question of the first-person narrator. She was concerned with the accountability and authority, the authenticity and reliability of a person of narrating a work. She distinguished between the unproblematic "I" in letters and diaries which conceal the person from the author, and the unproblematic "I" in memoirs. She argued that Henry Miller and Louis-Ferdinand Céline placed themselves and their own personal experience directly at the centre of their novels. She referenced Tolstoy's The Kreuzer Sonata and Dostoyevsky's The House of the Dead as first-person narrators of the inner story. She argued that narrators could provide a new treatment of time (for example Italo Svevo), of material (for example Proust) or of space (for example Hans Henny Jahnn). Bachmann asserted that in the modern novel the "I" had shifted and the narrator no longer lives the story, instead the story is in the narrator.

In the fourth lecture Der Umgang mit Namen (The Close association with Names) Bachmann explored how names could have a life of their own. She discussed the use of names in contemporary literature. She identified "denied names" such as in Kafka's The Castle, "ironic naming" by Thomas Mann, "name games" in James Joyce's Ulysses and instances where the identity of the character is not secured by a name but by the context, such as in Faulkner's The Sound and the Fury.

In the fifth lecture on Literatur als Utopie (Literature as Utopia) she turned to the question of what makes literature utopian. She argued that it was the process that was set in motion in the writer and reader as a result of their interaction with literature that made a work utopian. She argued that literature could make us aware of the lack, both in the work and in our own world. Readers could remove this lack by giving the work a chance in our time. Thus she argued each work of literature is "a realm which reaches forward and has unknown limits". Bachmann's understanding of utopia as direction rather than a goal, and her argument that it was the function of literature to take an utopian direction stemmed from Robert Musil who had analysed European modernism in his dissertation on Ernst Mach.

Legacy 
Although German language writers such as Hilde Domin, Luise Rinser and Nelly Sachs had published notable works on women's issues in the post-war period it was only in the 1970s that a feminist movement emerged in West Germany. After her death, Bachmann became popular among feminist readers. Feminist scholars' engagement with her work after her death led to a wave of scholarship that also drew attention to her prose work. Her works gained popularity within the emerging Frauenliteratur (women's literature) movement which struggled to find the authentic female voice. New publishing houses carried the movement, such as the feminist press Frauenoffensive (Women's Offensive), which published writings by Verena Stefan.

The Ingeborg Bachmann Prize
The Ingeborg Bachmann Prize, awarded annually in Klagenfurt since 1977, is named after her.

Works

Poetry collections 
  1953: Die gestundete Zeit
 1956: Anrufung des Grossen Bären
 2000: Ich weiß keine bessere Welt. (Unpublished Poems)
 2006: Darkness Spoken: The Collected Poems of Ingeborg Bachmann. translator Peter Filkins, Zephyr Press,

Radio plays 
  1952: Ein Geschäft mit Träumen
  1955: Die Zikaden
  1959: Der gute Gott von Manhattan (won the Hörspielpreis der Kriegsblinden in 1959)
2011: Die Radiofamilie. The Radio Family, translated by Mike Mitchell (2014)

Libretti 
  1960: Der Prinz von Homburg
  1965: Der junge Lord

Collections of short stories 
Das dreißigste Jahr (1961). The Thirtieth Year, translated by Michael Bullock (1964).
Simultan (1972). Three Paths to the Lake, translated by Mary Fran Gilbert (1989). The eponymous short story in this collection was adapted as a film by Michael Haneke in 1976.

Novel 
Malina (1971). Translated by Philip Boehm (1990; revised 2019).

Unfinished novels 
 Der Fall Franza / Requiem für Fanny Goldmann (Piper, 1979). The Book of Franza / Requiem for Fanny Goldmann, translated by Peter Filkins (1999).
 "Todesarten"-Projekt (Piper, 1995). Compiles:
Todesarten, Ein Ort für Zufalle, Wüstenbuch, Requiem für Fanny Goldmann, Goldmann/Rottwitz-Roman und andere Texte
 Das Buch Franza
 Malina (2 v. )
 Der "Simultan"-Band und andere späte Erzählungen

Essays and public speeches 
 1959: Die Wahrheit ist dem Menschen zumutbar (poetological speech at a German presentation of awards,)
1955: Frankfurter Vorlesungen (lecture on problems of contemporary literature)

Letters

Thesis

In popular culture 
A film, Ingeborg Bachmann – Journey into the Desert, on her life was producted, starring Vicky Krieps as Bachmann and directed by Margarethe von Trotta. It will premiere at 73rd Berlin International Film Festival in February and will be released on 26 October 2023 in theatres.

See also

List of Austrian writers
List of Austrians

References

Sources 
 Hartwig, Ina: Wer war Ingeborg Bachmann? Eine Biographie in Bruchstücken. S. Fischer, Frankfurt am Main 2017,

External links
 
 Feminize Your Canon: Ingeborg Bachmann. The Paris Review
 author page at Lyrikline.org, with audio and text in German, and translations into Dutch.
 "The Drugs, the Words" Center for the Art of Translation Web Exclusive Content, Translated by Peter Filkins (English)
 
 
Sound recordings with Ingeborg Bachmann in the Online Archive of the Österreichische Mediathek (Literary readings, interviews and radio reports) 

1926 births
1973 deaths
Austrian essayists
Philosophers of language
Austrian women poets
Writers from Klagenfurt
Anton Wildgans Prize winners
Georg Büchner Prize winners
Austrian women philosophers
20th-century Austrian philosophers
Austrian women essayists
20th-century Austrian women writers
20th-century Austrian poets
German-language poets
20th-century essayists
Austrian opera librettists
Women librettists
Members of the German Academy for Language and Literature